The 2018–19 Hong Kong FA Cup was the 44th edition of the Hong Kong FA Cup. 10 teams entered this edition, with two games played in First Round before the Quarter-final stage. The competition was only open to clubs who participated in the 2018–19 Hong Kong Premier League, with lower division sides entering a separate competition.

The champion received HK$100,000 in prize money and the runners up received HK$40,000. The MVP of the final received a HK$10,000 bonus.

Bracket

Bold = winner
* = after extra time, = penalty shootout score

Fixtures and results

First round

Quarter-finals

Semi-finals

Final

References

2018-19
FA Cup
Hong Kong